Transracial people identify as a different race than the one associated with their biological ancestry. They may adjust their appearance to make themselves look more like that race, and they may participate in activities associated with that race.

Controversy over the term
Historically, transracial has been used to describe parents who adopt a child of a different race.

The use of the term to describe changing racial identity has been criticized by members of the transracial adoption community. Kevin H. Vollmers, executive director of an adoption non-profit, said the term is being "appropriated and co-opted"  and that this is a "slap in the face" to transracial adoptees. In June 2015, about two dozen transracial adoptees, transracial parents and academics published an open letter in which they condemned the new usage as "erroneous, ahistorical, and dangerous."

In April 2017, the feminist philosophy journal Hypatia published an academic paper in support of recognizing transracialism and drawing parallels between transracial and transgender identity. Publication of this paper resulted in considerable controversy. The subject was also explored in Trans: Gender and Race in an Age of Unsettled Identities, a 2016 book by UCLA sociology professor Rogers Brubaker, who argues that the phenomenon, though offensive to many, is psychologically real to many people, and has many examples throughout history.

Examples
 Rachel Dolezal is known for identifying as a black woman despite having been born to white parents. She successfully passed as black, to the extent that she took over leadership of the Spokane branch of the NAACP in 2014, a year before her "outing" in 2015.
 Martina Big, who was featured on Maury in September 2017, is a woman of white ancestry who identifies as black. Big has had tanning injections administered by a physician to darken her skin and hair.
 Oli London, a British influencer and singer who identifies as Korean, and has had numerous plastic surgeries to confirm his current racial identity. London modelled his appearance on his idol, BTS singer Jimin.
 Korla Pandit, an African-American musician who posed as an Indian from New Delhi in both his public and private life. Pandit was born John Roland Redd.

See also 
Black Like Me
 Ethnic plastic surgery
 Body dysmorphic disorder
 Racial misrepresentation
 Pretendian

References

Further reading 
 
 

 
Cultural assimilation
Collective identity
Passing (sociology)
Race (human categorization)
Race and society
Subcultures